Shyam Palav is an Indian cinematographer. He came into recognition with his work for the Telugu film Johnny (2003) starring Pawan Kalyan.

Career
He started his career working as the assistant cameraman for the film Gehrayee. Later he started his work as a cinematographer. He was known for his work in cinematography for the Telugu film Johnny.

Johnny
Palav's work was not recognised, though he has done films like Peechha Karro and Yeh Hai Jalwa, which stars Salman Khan. His work was very much praised when he got a chance in Pawan Kalyan's movie Johnny. Palav and Chota K. Naidu handled the Cinematography for Johnny. Johnny'''s cinematography was praised for the colour and theme used.

 Filmography as cinematographer Johnny (2003)Yeh Hai Jalwa (1999)Peechha Karro (1988)

 Filmography as cameraman Gehrayee'' (1980)

References

Telugu film cinematographers
Living people
Year of birth missing (living people)